Dennis Muren, A.S.C (born November 1, 1946) is an American film visual effects artist and supervisor. He has worked on the films of George Lucas, Steven Spielberg, and James Cameron, among others, and has won nine Oscars in total: eight for Best Visual Effects and a Technical Achievement Academy Award. The Visual Effects Society has called him "a perpetual student, teacher, innovator, and mentor."

He has been identified as "a pioneer in bringing a new wave of visual effects films to the public, opening the doors for screenwriters and directors to tell stories never before possible with a new realism through the use of his skills in cinematic arts and advanced technologies."

According to Spielberg, Muren "set the example at Industrial Light & Magic for visual effects excellence with effects that add strong, appropriate emotion to a shot and fit seamlessly into a movie."

Early life
Muren was born in 1946 in Glendale, California, the son of Charline Louise (née Clayton) and Elmer Ernest Muren. His interest in photography began at eight years old while shooting model spaceships and dinosaurs. Muren quickly deepened his interest in effects by studying the films of John Fulton, Ray Harryhausen, and Howard Lydecker. He was fascinated by what he observed around him, in appearance and purpose, which led him to study the artwork of John Singer Sargent and Frank Frazetta. He never attended film school but was self-taught, and also learned through friendships with other young Los Angeles effects enthusiasts, including Jim Danforth and David Allen.

In 1965, after graduating from John Muir High School in Pasadena, California, and during a summer vacation at Pasadena City College as a business major, Muren raised $6,500 to make The Equinox, a 71-minute supernatural film incorporating the visual effects techniques he had grown up admiring. He sold it to producer Jack Harris who hired film editor Jack Woods to write and direct additional footage that added a demonic villain and made the film 82 minutes long. When Equinox was released in May 1970, Muren was credited as a producer despite having directed much of the film and created the special effects. Despite its mixed to weak reviews, the movie made enough money for Muren to recoup his investment, and in the years since, it has become a minor cult classic.

Industrial Light & Magic 
After earning his associate's degree, Muren struggled for years to find steady work as a visual effects cameraman in Hollywood. In 1976, Muren was hired as 2nd cameraman at Industrial Light & Magic (ILM), then an upstart visual effects studio founded by George Lucas, to work on Star Wars. The film was released in 1977 to wide critical and public acclaim and was for years the highest-grossing film of all time. With a weekend off, he immediately went to work on Spielberg’s Close Encounters of the Third Kind, photographing the Mothership for Douglas Trumbull.

After working a few months on a new television series, Battlestar Galactica, for John Dykstra, Muren moved to Marin County, California, to help build a new ILM. He was hired as effects director of photography with a focus on the techniques and photography of miniatures on Star Wars: The Empire Strikes Back. After that, Muren worked primarily as a Visual Effects Supervisor on all of his films. Former ILM president Jim Morris said Muren "could always find a way to look at a problem from a different angle and come up with a shot or scene that would be wondrous to watch". Over the next seven years, he would win five Oscars.

When Lucas started the Lucasfilm Computer Graphic Group in 1979, Muren hoped to use their technology to make better, original movie images. In a collaboration, he directed the group in the making of the CGI stained glass swordsman for Young Sherlock Holmes, earning an Oscar nomination.

The Graphics Group was sold in 1986, and Lucas started the ILM Computer Graphics Division with Muren helping voice ILM's needs for the digital image to mimic film qualities from lenses to film stocks, with user-friendly tools to mirror what humans see. He has said that his years spent observing and building an understanding of the physical world were invaluable to making virtual realities. 

In their first big project, Muren directed the Division in creating shape-shifting animals using in-house custom software for "morphing" (blending) footage of animatronic models in Willow (1988). The Abyss (1989), Terminator 2: Judgment Day (1991), and Jurassic Park (1993) followed. Steven Spielberg had intended to use go-motion for the Jurassic Park dinosaurs, but a CG test of a walking skeleton T-Rex made by ILM's Steve Williams and Mark Dippe (with Marin County as the backdrop) convinced Universal to fund a proof-of-concept, photo-real, no-excuse shot. In three months, following Muren's cinematic goals, the ILM CG department broke new ground, adding organically moving flesh and muscle to the creature's skeleton, covering it with animal-like skin texture and exterior sun and bounce lighting to make a photorealistic walking T-Rex. "It's going to be amazing. People are really going to believe that dinosaurs are walking this earth today," said Steven Spielberg. It was "the shock of the new," earning Muren an Oscar for Best Visual Effects (shared with Stan Winston, Phil Tippett, and Michael Lantieri).

Jurassic Park was the breakthrough that convinced Lucas that technology had advanced enough to make the Star Wars prequels. Director Peter Jackson was similarly inspired by the technical breakthrough in Jurassic Park to begin planning the Lord of the Rings trilogy (2001-2003) and King Kong (2005).

Personal life 
Muren is married to British documentary filmmaker and landscape architect Zara Muren, who produced and directed Dream of The Sea Ranch and The Landscape Architecture of Roberto Burle Marx. They have two children and  live in California.

In June 1999, Muren was honored with a star on the Hollywood Walk of Fame, the first visual effects artist to be so recognized. He is also a recipient of nine Oscars for Best Visual Effects and a Technical Achievement Academy Award, the most of any living person. 

He has a small, non-speaking role in Raiders of the Lost Ark; he appeared as a Nazi spy who peers over a magazine as Indiana Jones (Harrison Ford) boards a passenger plane. Due to their similarity in facial appearance (despite great variation in height), this character is often mistaken for Major Toht (Ronald Lacey), the film's primary antagonist, but it has been confirmed that they are not the same. Muren also had a cameo in the theme-park attraction Star Tours.

Novel builds and innovations 

 1980-1983: Used an animation camera stand as a 4-axis optical printer to make dozens of dramatic shots in The Empire Strikes Back and Return of the Jedi. They referred to it as “pin blocking."
 1983: In three days, Muren pre-visualized more than 100 shots for the Return of the Jedi speeder bike chase by hand-holding the first tiny video camera and taping a Barbie and Ken doll as well as cardboard tubes on a shag carpet.
 1984: Used a Nikon F3 camera as a go-motion movie camera to photograph much of the Indiana Jones and the Temple of Doom mine car chase, saving construction and shooting time.
 1985: Directed the Lucasfilm Graphics Group to make the first photo-real CGI character, the "Stained Glass Knight" for Young Sherlock Holmes, and the first theatrical-quality digital film composite.
 1987: With ILM’s new CGI department, Muren pre-visualized the original Star Tours ride-film for Disneyland in early CGI to work out the story, moves, and timings for a four-minute continuous view out the shuttle’s front window.
 1988: Directed the first digital 2D morphing effect for Ron Howard's Willow.
 1990: After The Abyss, Muren took a one-year sabbatical to study CGI software and hardware theory, to which he credits much of the success of the Terminator 2: Judgment Day digital effects.
 1991: During his sabbatical, he assembled the first robust film scanning, manipulating, recording system for flawless, photo-real 2D and 3D image manipulation. It was used for Terminator 2: Judgment Day, then Death Becomes Her, and Jurassic Park, among other films.
 1993: Directed the CGI dinosaurs to their photo-real conclusions for Jurassic Park.
 1992-1995: Directed proof-of-concept CG tests for Death Becomes Her and Twister.
 2001: Used a real-time, on-set rendering and compositing preview viewing with a 6-axis camera movement for A.I. Artificial Intelligence.
 2003: Made a live on-set portable previz using the Unreal Tournament game engine on a laptop PC to display the film camera's live view under a live render of Hulk's 12-foot-tall shape, in real time, as a live on-set previz.
 2012: Supervised unreleased 3D conversions of Attack of the Clones and Revenge of the Sith with exaggerated depths that he called Extreme 3D.

Affiliations 

 American Society Of Cinematography
 Academy of Motion Picture Arts and Sciences
 Visual Effects Society

Engagements 

 Academy of Motion Pictures Arts & Sciences
 American Film Institute
 American Society of Cinematographers
 Smithsonian Institute
 Supercomputing Conference
 BFI
 Berlin Film Festival

 California Film Institute
 Dallas Film Festival
 UCLA Film Department
 UC Berkeley Film Series
 Liverpool University Film
 MARS 2019
 Mill Valley Film Festival
 New Yorker Conference
 Paris Images Digital Conference
 San Francisco Art Institute
 SIGGRAPH
 ShowBiz Expo
 Yerba Buena Center for the Arts
 USA Film Festival
 USC Film Department
 VIEW Conference - Torino

Filmography and select awards 
Academy, BAFTA, Emmy, and VES Awards

References

External links

 Starwars.com (2005). Dennis Muren. Retrieved 3 July 2005.
 Hollywood.com (2005). Dennis Muren. Retrieved 3 July 2005.
 Tome, Chris for 3dvfx.net (2000). The Dennis Muren Interview. Retrieved 3 July 2005.
 Erickson, Hal for Allmovie (2004). Equinox entry at Allmovie. Retrieved 3 July 2005.

1946 births
Living people
Special effects people
Visual effects supervisors
Pasadena City College alumni
People from Glendale, California
Best Visual Effects Academy Award winners
Best Visual Effects BAFTA Award winners
Special Achievement Academy Award winners
Industrial Light & Magic people
Academy Award for Technical Achievement winners